João Souza and Víctor Estrella were the defending champions, but Estrella chose to compete in León instead. Souza partnered up with Leonardo Tavares, but they lost against Sebastián Decoud and Carlos Salamanca in the first round.
Dominik Meffert and Philipp Oswald won in the final 6–7(4), 7–6(6), [10–5], against Gero Kretschmer and Alex Satschko

Seeds

Draw

Draw

References
 Doubles Draw

Seguros Bolivar Open Pereira - Doubles
2010 Doubles